Le Perrey is a commune in the Eure department in the Normandy region in northern France. It was established on 1 January 2019 by merger of the former communes of Fourmetot (the seat), Saint-Ouen-des-Champs and Saint-Thurien.

See also
Communes of the Eure department

References

Communes of Eure
States and territories established in 2019